Mashenka or Maschenka may refer to:

 Mashenka or Mary (Nabokov novel)
 Maschenka (1987 film), British film based on the novel
 Mashenka (1942 film), Russian film unrelated to the novel